Bangem is a town and commune in Cameroon.

Bangem is the capital of Kupe Muanenguba division (consisting of Bangem, Tombel and Nguti subdivisions) and also considered as the heart-land of the Bakossi tribe. Nestled halfway up Mount Muanenguba and it famous twin lakes, Bangem enjoys a cool, rainy climate.

The dry season is short and lasts from November to March, and the rest of the year there are rains. The road network is deplorable and travel in the wet season can be slow and uncomfortable.

Bangem has roads to Melong, Tombel and Nguti, but only the Melong-Bangem road is passable by car, the others can be passed on a bike.

Bangem is beautiful and has among the most tourist potential of any part of Cameroon. Currently there is a slightly developed tourist site at the crater lakes of Mount Muanenguba (about 10 km uphill from Bangem)that is managed by the Bangem council. But other sites are equally interesting and beautiful, but more inaccessible. The nearby Bakossi National Park boasts of some of the most diverse rain forest, with exceptional species diversity of plants. Furthermore the park has chimpanzees and a large population of drills. Additionally, the nearby Bayang-Mbo Wildlife Sanctuary boasts of forest elephants, chimpanzees, pangolins and other interesting creatures. More information on possible tourist destinations can be found online.

Bangem area also is home to many species of interesting birds, reptiles, amphibians and fishes as well. Including the world's largest frog, the Goliath frog, the Mount Kupe Brush Shrike, various species of hornbills etc. Furthermore, the nearby Lake Bermin boasts of the highest species diversity of fishes as compared to the size of the lake, of any lake in the world. The 9 tilapia species are endemic sister species, implying sympatric speciation, making it of critical interest to conservationists and evolutionary biologists alike.

The area, however, remains under threat of attack from guerilla forces belonging to the Ambazonia forces that operate in the region and are seeking independence from Cameroon. In 2017, the mayor was kidnapped, and as such, the area in general is unsafe, and a visit at certain times might not be recommended, such as during festivals, when the guerrilla pick up their attacks.

Farming
Bangem is made up predominantly of farmers and produces "waterfufu", Cocoyams, Cassava, Plantain, and Corn.

Every Wednesday, the general market is held in Bangem. However, other villages have their markets too, like Muambong, Nkikoh, Ekambeng, Mboasum and Muaku.

People
Bangem possesses many elites as Elung Paul Check, Phillip Ngolle Ngwesse, Ekane Michael, Mark Kogge, Ekane Ivo Ekoti and Mbolle Epie.

Bangem also possesses a number of youth elites who have been named as Junior Parliamentarians in the Cameroon National Assembly: 
Henry Makogge (2012)
Ekane Loic Evrade (2013)
Enongene Sammy (2014)

See also
Communes of Cameroon

References
 Site de la primature - Élections municipales 2002 
 Contrôle de gestion et performance des services publics communaux des villes camerounaises - Thèse de Donation Avele, Université Montesquieu Bordeaux IV 
Female and Male Twin Lakes of Muanenguba, Cameroon
 Charles Nanga, La réforme de l’administration territoriale au Cameroun à la lumière de la loi constitutionnelle n° 96/06 du 18 janvier 1996, Mémoire ENA. 

Communes of Southwest Region (Cameroon)